This is a list of yearly Gulf South Conference football standings.

Gulf South Conference standings

References

Gulf South Conference
Standings